Carinapex is a genus of sea snails, marine gastropod mollusks in the family Horaiclavidae.

It was previously included within the subfamily Crassispirinae, family Turridae.

Species
Species within the genus Carinapex include:
 Carinapex albarnesi Wiedrick, 2015 
 Carinapex alisonkayae Wiedrick, 2015
 Carinapex amirowlandae Wiedrick, 2015
 Carinapex cernohorskyi Wiedrick, 2015
 Carinapex chaneyi Wiedrick, 2015
 Carinapex johnwiedricki Wiedrick, 2015
 Carinapex lindseygrovesi Wiedrick, 2015
 Carinapex minutissima (Garrett, 1873) 
 Carinapex mooreorum Wiedrick, 2015
 Carinapex papillosa (Garrett, 1873)
 Carinapex philippinensis Wiedrick, 2015
 Carinapex solomonensis Wiedrick, 2015

References

 Wiedrick S.G. (2015). Review of the genus Carinapex Dall, 1924 with the description of ten new species (Gastropoda: Conoidea: Horaiclavidae) from the Pacific Ocean. The Festivus. 47(1): 5-28. page(s): 6, pl. 1 figs 9-12

External links

 
Horaiclavidae
Gastropod genera